The Roanoke Rapids Graded School District (RRGSD) is a school district headquartered in Roanoke Rapids, North Carolina.

History
Recognizing the serious need for additional educational opportunities in Roanoke Rapids, a group of residents asked the North Carolina General Assembly to grant them a charter for a school district. It was adopted February 26, 1907.
In 1908, A.E. Akers was chosen among 70 applicants as the first superintendent at an annual salary of $1,000.  Akers was also required to teach the sixth and seventh grades. 

A bond issue to build Roanoke Rapids High School was approved in 1920.  Hobart Upjohn, a noted New York architect, was chosen to design the very best possible facility for the students and the community.  The new building was not quite finished when the graduation of the class of 1921 was help there.  The new half million dollar high school officially opened September 16, 1921.  This building, with its classic Elizabethan style, has served as a landmark in Roanoke Rapids and northeastern North Carolina.

In 1924, the junior building was completed on the same campus.

In 1935 the district opened Clara Hearne School to serve the needs of its growing elementary aged population.  The school is located on the west side of town at Eighth and Cedar Streets.

A new elementary school on the west side of town was opened in 1936 and named Vance Street School Later it was named William L. Medlin School in honor of a former, well respected Board member who had served the community well for 32 years.

In 1957 additions to all elementary schools were completed and William L Manning School was constructed with state bond money.

The school board selected Jane B. Burke as the first female superintendent.  She was hired for three years beginning July 1, 1995.

The current superintendent Dain Butler was hired in 2016.  Dr. Butler established the districts new mission, vision, and strategic plan in July 2017.

In January 2018, the Trustees and the Halifax County Commissioners cut the ribbon on the new Manning Elementary School.

In August 2018, RRGSD opened the district's first Early College High School in cooperation with Halifax Community College. Roanoke Rapids Early College High School will jumpstart students’ college education and career preparation by blending high school and two years of college.

 its student body is 70% white. The Halifax County School District and Weldon City Schools both had student bodies that were almost all of races other than non-Hispanic white.

As of 2017 the racial makeup was to 66% white, 21% black, 8% Hispanic, and 5% other.

The district's website shows the racial makeup for 2018 as: White 59%, Black 27%, Hispanic 8%, and Other 6%

Schools
 Roanoke Rapids High School
 Chaloner Middle School
 Belmont Elementary School
 Manning Elementary School
 Clara Hearne Pre-K Center
Roanoke Rapids Early College High School

References

External links
 

School districts in North Carolina
Education in Halifax County, North Carolina
School districts established in 1907